The VTV International Women's Volleyball Cup is an international volleyball tournament for women organised by the Volleyball Federation of Vietnam (VFV), and sponsored by Vietnam Television (VTV). The cup was established in 2004 and held every year. From 2020 to 2022, the tournament was cancelled due to worldwide COVID-19 pandemic and the reschedule of 2021 Southeast Asian Games.

Past Champions

Medal table

Awards

MVP
 2004 –  Yelena Pavlova
 2005 –  Sana Ayako
 2006 –  Chen Jing
 2007 –  Tatyana Pyurova
 2008 –  Jong Jin-sim
 2009 –  Nguyễn Thị Ngọc Hoa
 2010 –  Đỗ Thị Minh
 2011 –  Asuka Minamoto
 2012 –  Jong Jin-sim
 2013 –  Nguyễn Thị Ngọc Hoa
 2014 –  Nguyễn Thị Ngọc Hoa
 2015 –  Jong Jin-sim
 2016 –  Aprilia Santini Manganang
 2017 –  Yuka Imamura
 2018 –  Trần Thị Thanh Thúy
 2019 –  Mizuki Yanagita
 2023 –

Miss Volleyball
 2004 –  Phạm Thị Kim Huệ
 2005 –  Inoue Kaori
 2006 –  Boonchoo Saengravee
 2007 –  Ida Ayana
 2008 –  Phạm Thị Yến
 2009 –  Chen Jiao
 2010 –  Degtyarova Maryna
 2011 –  Ji Jung-hee
 2012 –  Misaki Tanaka
 2013 –  Batkuldina Aliya
 2014 –  Lê Thanh Thúy
 2015 –  Nguyễn Linh Chi
 2016 –  Nandita Ayu Salsabila
 2017 –  Lee Jun-yung
 2018 –  Đặng Thị Kim Thanh
 2019 –  Dinara Syzdykova
 2023 –

References

 
International women's volleyball competitions
Women's volleyball in Vietnam
International volleyball competitions hosted by Vietnam
Recurring sporting events established in 2004
2004 establishments in Vietnam